Inkdeath (German title: Tintentod) is a 2007 young adult fantasy novel by Cornelia Funke. It is the third novel in the Inkheart series, following Inkheart and Inkspell.

Plot summary
The plot resumes a few weeks after  Inkspell left off; Farid and Meggie's mission of bringing Dustfinger, who died at the end of Inkspell, back to life.

Inkdeath picks up with the now immortal, but slowly decaying, evil Adderhead, ruler of the southern part of the Inkworld, his brother-in-law the Milksop king of Ombra, and his trusty right-hand man, The Piper, ruling over the city of Ombra and the small villages around it. They set harsher taxes and loot what they can from the villages. The three Folcharts, Meggie, Resa, and Mortimer, along with an unborn Folchart child, reside at a peaceful abandoned farm that has long been forgotten by others. Farid, who has given up his fire after the death of Dustfinger, works for an increasingly wealthy Orpheus. Orpheus treats him like a slave while promising that he will read a dead Dustfinger back to life. Fenoglio, the author, gives up writing at the beginning of the book and grows increasingly drunken and senile. He is immensely annoyed at how Orpheus is changing Inkworld and asking his never-ending questions about the "White Women". Ombra is under constant threat by the Adderhead's men, who have killed nearly every young adult male in the city and regularly kidnap children to work them in the mines. The only figure standing in their way is the romanticized "Bluejay", a thief created by Fenoglio in a series of songs that were inspired by Mo who is now "stuck" as the "Bluejay" and is in as much trouble as ever.

Meanwhile, Orpheus, who has been tediously changing the story, succeeds in calling a meeting of the robber graveyard to get the Bluejay to bring Dustfinger back to life and die in the process. Mo agrees, and summons the White women, who bring him to the world of the dead for what turns out to be three days. During this time, Meggie believes her father is dead and becomes furious with both Farid and her mother, Resa. In the world of the dead, Mo meets Death itself, who makes a bargain with Mo: Death will release Dustfinger from her grasp and Mo as well, as long as Mo finishes what he started, and writes the three words in the White Book, the book that makes the Adderhead immortal. If he does not succeed, Death will take him, Dustfinger, and Meggie, as she was partially involved in the binding of The White Book. He awakens from the world of death, bringing Dustfinger with him. They are now both nearly fearless, Dustfinger is now scarless, and they are both inseparable from each other.

Mo finds himself enjoying the Bluejay role, and has no intention of leaving Inkworld despite Meggie and Resa's urgings. Meggie finds herself increasingly distanced from Farid, and drawn to another young man named Doria, a member of the Black Prince's robber camp. The plot picks up when nearly all of the children of Ombra are kidnapped by The Piper and threatened to be taken to the mines where they will surely die. Mo, now known almost exclusively as the Bluejay, cannot accept this and frees them by giving himself up in exchange. He discovers that the Adderhead's daughter, Violante, known as Her Ugliness, wishes to take his side in the matter. She gets him back safely to the robbers' camp while keeping her allegiance a secret from The Piper and her young son Jacopo, a follower of the Adderhead and admirer of the Piper. The Piper is sent to follow after the children. The Milksop goes after the group of robbers, but Fenoglio saves them by writing giant human nests up in the trees.

Mo goes off in secret with Dustfinger, Violante, and her legion of child soldiers to the castle in the lake, where the white book is kept. In the meantime, Orpheus has put himself in the service of the Adderhead, in the hopes of picking the winning team but doesn't because Mo has a few tricks up his sleeve. He is also plagued by visits from a now insane Mortola, who still works for the return of her dead son, Capricorn. The Bluejay and Dustfinger face difficulty at the castle, and their plans go awry.  Mo, Dustfinger, and Brianna, Dustfinger's daughter, are all eventually imprisoned. For Brianna's sake, Dustfinger momentarily betrays Mo. At this point, Resa arrives in the form of a Swift, saves Mo from going insane, and restates Dustfinger's allegiance. Resa and Dustfinger search for The White Book unsuccessfully while the Bluejay, who has been captured again by the Piper, works on creating a new white book for the Adderhead. Jacopo betrays his grandfather, the Adderhead, by giving Mo the original white book so that he is able to write the three words, thus killing the Adderhead.

Inkdeath concludes as Orpheus, finding himself on the losing end, flees to the northern mountains, Fenoglio is writing again, and Farid decides to go traveling with his regained power of fire, asking if Meggie would join him. Meggie, now in love with Doria, bids Farid farewell and good luck. Violante, now known as Her Kindliness, becomes ruler of Ombra, and a new Folchart, a boy, is born into Inkworld, longing to visit the world that his parents and sister were born in, with its horseless carriages and flying machines.

Critical reception
Critical reception for Inkdeath has been mixed to negative. Publishers Weekly said, "The interesting meta-fictional questions—can we alter destiny? shape our own fate?—are overwhelmed by the breakneck action, yet the villains aren't fully realized. More disappointingly, the formerly feisty Meggie, barely into her teens, has little to do but choose between two suitors. Funke seems to have forgotten her original installment was published for children". Kirkus Reviews was slightly more positive, saying that "Funke's storytelling is as compelling as ever", but all the same agreeing that "the natural audience for this brooding saga seems, sadly, to be teens and up and not the children who so eagerly responded to Inkheart".

References

External links

Official Cornelia Funke website

2007 German novels
Inkheart trilogy books
German fantasy novels
2007 fantasy novels
German children's novels
2007 children's books

de:Tintenwelt-Trilogie#Tintentod